Lester George Jackson III (born July 26, 1959) is a former state Senator from Chatham County, Georgia. He was the 2009 presidential appointee to the Democratic National Committee, becoming the first person from the coastal region of Georgia to serve in this capacity in over 19 years. Lester George Jackson III is the grandson of George Jackson and Stella Caswell, Eddie Coats and Minnie Washington, and the son of Lester George Jr. and Annie Coats. Jackson is brother of Sonya Taylor, Arnold Bernard, Anthony Wade, Timothy Leon and Julie Lewis.

A Savannah family dentist, Jackson was first elected to the State Senate in 2008 following 10 years of service in the House of Representatives. He was named Georgia's Freshman Legislator of the Year in 1999 by Georgia Legislative Black Caucus. He served as assistant house majority whip. The Georgia Dental Association honored him as the Legislator of the Year in 2000 and 2002, and he received the 2001 Distinguished Service Award from the National Dental Association. In 2000, Jackson was a delegate to the Democratic National Convention in Boston; and again a delegate in Denver in 2008. He was selected by the Georgia Legislative Black Caucus as its Legislator of the Year in 2008 and 2010. He is a Fellow of the Pierre Fauchard Academy Dental Society.

As of 2013, Jackson served on the Senate Agriculture and Consumer Affairs, Economic Development, Health and Human Services, Higher Education, and Urban Affairs Committees.

A lifelong resident of Savannah and a product of Chatham County public schools, Jackson received the Savannah Community Service Award in 2009. He is also the recipient of the 2009 Savannah State University Alumni Association Legislator of the Year Award. He attended Paine College and in 1985 received his doctor of dental surgery degree from Meharry Medical College. He is an assistant adjunct professor at Medical College of Georgia and an adjunct professor at Armstrong Atlantic State University.

Jackson is a U.S. Navy veteran and a life member of the NAACP, and a life member of Kappa Alpha Psi fraternity. He is a charter member of the Savannah Chapter of the 100 Black Men, and member of the American Legion, Post 500. He and his wife, Dr. Lorna Jackson, have four children, Charity, Leah, Lester IV and Jonathan and Uncle of Tracey W. Valencia

See also

 List of state government committees (Georgia)

References

External links
 Profile at the Georgia State Senate
  Lester Jackson for Labor Commissioner
 Georgia State Senate bio of Jackson

Democratic Party members of the Georgia House of Representatives
Democratic Party Georgia (U.S. state) state senators
Living people
Politicians from Savannah, Georgia
African-American state legislators in Georgia (U.S. state)
21st-century American politicians
African-American dentists
American dentists
1959 births
21st-century African-American politicians
20th-century African-American people